was a Japanese actor and voice actor.

Life and career 
Arihiro Hase was the son of Sanji Hase and was formerly affiliated with Production M-3; he was attached to Sigma Club at the time of his death. Hase is best known for voicing Hikaru Ichijyo in the Macross series, a part he got when he was only 17 years old in high school.

Hase was a close friend of fellow Macross actress and singer Mari Iijima after the series ended and frequently attended her concerts until his death.

Death 
On July 30, 1996, at approximately 4:00 A.M., Hase jumped from his apartment's window seven stories to the ground. Sanji confirmed in TV interviews that his son's death was ruled a suicide; he was 31 years old. Following his death, recordings of his voice as Hikaru were reused in the video game adaptation of Macross: Do You Remember Love?.

In 2005, Iijima reprised her role of Lynn Minmay for the ADV Films English dub release of Macross, and in interviews has stated that she is dedicating this new release to him.

Selected filmography

Anime 
 The Super Dimension Fortress Macross (1982) - Hikaru Ichijyo
 The Super Dimension Fortress Macross: Do You Remember Love? (1984) - Hikaru Ichijyo
 Super Dimension Cavalry Southern Cross (1984) - Bowie Emerson
 The Super Dimension Fortress Macross: Flash Back 2012 (1987) - Hikaru Ichijyo
 Macross 7 (1994) - Bobby Lacoste

Video games 
 Chō Jikū Yōsai Macross: Ai Oboete Imasu ka (1997) - Hikaru Ichijyo

References

External links 
 
 A PICTURE of an older (circa 1992) Arihiro Hase on a Japanese 1980s-Fan website. His pic is at the bottom of that page. His pic and info about his career and demise are preceded on the page by a lengthy article about the singer Mari Iijima, who played Minmay.

1965 births
1996 deaths
Japanese male film actors
Japanese male voice actors
Male voice actors from Tokyo
Nihon University alumni
Suicides by jumping in Japan
20th-century Japanese male actors
1996 suicides